Virginia Yarur Ready (born 14 December 1966 in Santiago, Chile) is a Chilean dressage rider. She won a team bronze at the 2014 South American Games, and has competed at four Pan American Games (in 1995, 2011, 2015 and 2019). She is based in Wellington, Florida.

Yarur represented Chile during the 2020 Olympic Games after Bermuda did not fulfilled the qualification criteria, while Chile replaced Bermuda. The last time Chile was represented in dressage during the Olympic Games was in 1968. She was ranked 46th in the individual competition during the Olympic Games.

References

External links
 

Living people
1966 births
Chilean female equestrians
Chilean dressage riders
South American Games bronze medalists for Chile
South American Games medalists in equestrian
Competitors at the 2010 South American Games
Competitors at the 2014 South American Games
Pan American Games competitors for Chile
Equestrians at the 1995 Pan American Games
Equestrians at the 2011 Pan American Games
Equestrians at the 2015 Pan American Games
Equestrians at the 2019 Pan American Games
Equestrians at the 2020 Summer Olympics
Olympic equestrians of Chile
20th-century Chilean women